Transworld Ultra Rock is the seventh album of Japanese band Electric Eel Shock and was released in 2007. The Album was produced, engineered, mixed, and mastered by Attie Bauw. The album was recorded at Bauwhaus Studios, Amsterdam, The Netherlands. The Drums were recorded at The Tracking Room, Amsterdam, The Netherlands. Additional vocal arrangement and production on track 12 by David Laudat.

The name of this album is based upon the name of the hit 1970s Japanese television show Transamerica Ultra Quiz.

The songs "Joe" and "Joe II" were inspired by the 1970s Anime/Manga Tomorrow's Joe's main character.

Track listing

Tracks 13 and 14 are bonus tracks that only appear on the Japanese version of this album released by P-Vine Records. The bonus track "Bastard" was bastardised by Timmy B .

Release history

Personnel
 Akihito Morimoto – Guitar/Vocals
 Kazuto Maekawa – Bass
 Tomoharu "Gian" Ito – Drums
 The Bauwhaus Whistle Orchestra – Whistling on track 8 (Wayne Charlton credited as Lead Whistler)
 Jolien Grunberg – Additional vocals on track 12.
 Bob Slayer – Manager.

References

Electric Eel Shock albums
2007 albums